The Finance Minister of Denmark (Danish Finansministeren) is the head of the Ministry of Finance of Denmark,and a member of the Cabinet. As head of the ministry, the minister has responsibility for the ministry's tasks of administering the state finances via the fiscal policy, and making economic predictions and recommendations.

The current Finance Minister is Nicolai Wammen, appointed by Mette Frederiksen on 27 June 2019.

See also
List of Minister for Finance (Denmark)

References

 A resumé of the book At forme og tjene en ny tid - Finansministeriet 1848-1998 - From the Finance Ministry of Denmark (In Danish).

External links
The Finance Ministry of Denmark

Government ministerial offices of Denmark